San Nazzaro may refer to the following places:

Italy
San Nazzaro, Campania, a comune in the Province of Benevento
San Nazzaro Sesia, a comune in the Province of Novara, Piedmont
San Nazzaro Val Cavargna, a comune in the Province of Como, Lombardy

Switzerland
San Nazzaro, Switzerland, a former comune in the Canton of Ticino